Clanculus weedingi is a species of sea snail, a marine gastropod mollusk in the family Trochidae, the top snails.

Description
The size of the shell attains 11 mm.

Distribution
This marine species is endemic to Australia and occurs off South Australia and Western Australia.

References

 Cotton, B.C. 1938. The Joseph Banks Islands No 4. Mollusca. Part 2. Reports of the McCoy Society for Field Investigation and Research. Proceedings of the Royal Society of Victoria ns 51(1): 159-176
 Wilson, B. 1993. Australian Marine Shells. Prosobranch Gastropods. Kallaroo, Western Australia : Odyssey Publishing Vol. 1 408 pp.

External links
 To World Register of Marine Species
 

weedingi
Gastropods of Australia
Gastropods described in 1938